

Table 
The 1986 National Soccer League First Division was the second edition of the NSL First Division in South Africa. It was won by Rangers.

References

NSL First Division seasons